The 59th Assembly District of Wisconsin is one of 99 districts in the Wisconsin State Assembly.  Located in eastern Wisconsin, the district covers parts of western Washington County, eastern Fond du Lac County, western Sheboygan County, and southern and central Calumet County.  The district includes the city of New Holstein and most of the city of Hartford, as well as the villages of Campbellsport, Kewaskum, Mount Calvary, St. Cloud, and Stockbridge.  It also contains the Kettle Moraine State Forest Northern Unit, Theresa Marsh, and part of the Pike Lake State Park. The district is represented by Republican Ty Bodden, since January 2023.

The 59th Assembly district is located within Wisconsin's 20th Senate district, along with the 58th and 60th Assembly districts.

List of past representatives

References 

Wisconsin State Assembly districts
Washington County, Wisconsin
Fond du Lac County, Wisconsin
Sheboygan County, Wisconsin
Calumet County, Wisconsin